Same-sex marriage in Bermuda, a British Overseas Territory, is currently not recognised nor performed but it was legal between 2017 and 2022. However, marriages performed during that period remain valid.

Same-sex marriage first became legal on 5 May 2017, when the Supreme Court of Bermuda declared that same-sex couples had a legal right to marry in the territory after a couple filed suit against the Bermudian Government. However, a bill to ban same-sex marriage and establish domestic partnerships was passed by the Parliament in December 2017 and went into effect on 1 June 2018 though same-sex marriages performed before that day remained legally recognised.

In response to the renewed ban on same-sex marriage, two legal challenges were filed opposing the domestic partnership law. On 6 June 2018, the Supreme Court struck down the parts of the domestic partnership law that banned same-sex marriages but stayed the ruling while the government appealed to the Court of Appeal. The appeals court upheld the right of same-sex couples to marry when it handed down its ruling on 23 November 2018. The government challenged the Court of Appeal's ruling to the Judicial Committee of the Privy Council, which reversed the appeals court's finding on 14 March 2022, and banned same-sex marriage once again.

History
The Bermudian Government first made clear in 2004 that it would not consider the recognition of civil unions or same-sex marriages. In May 2006, MP Renee Webb tabled a private member's bill to add sexual orientation to the Human Rights Act 1981. The bill was squashed when the Parliament of Bermuda refused to discuss it. Socially, the situation was hard enough that some gay residents had chosen to emigrate, particularly to London, United Kingdom, where Bermudians and other British Overseas Territories citizens have a right to reside, to be able to live openly. One such emigrant noted that same-sex relationships had to essentially be secret, with partners introduced only as "friends" and relationships between two Bermudians as being very difficult. In June 2013, Parliament passed legislation prohibiting discrimination on the basis of sexual orientation under the human rights law.

On 18 June 2013, newly elected Premier Craig Cannonier ruled out same-sex marriage in Bermuda: "I can assure you that under my leadership this is not about same-sex marriage, and under my leadership that will not happen."

An amendment to Section 15 of the Matrimonial Causes Act 1974, which required marriage to be between a man and a woman, was introduced to Parliament in 2016. The amendment would override the Human Rights Act 1981'''s anti-discrimination provisions on the basis of sexual orientation and retain language stating that marriage is limited to a man and a woman. On 8 July 2016, the House of Assembly passed the bill by 20 votes to 10. On 21 July 2016, the Senate rejected the legislation 5–6.Senate rejects Human Rights Act Amendment

Referendum (2016)

On 11 February 2016, Attorney General Trevor Moniz announced that the government would introduce a bill to create civil unions for same-sex couples. He ruled out the legalisation of same-sex marriage. On 29 February 2016, it was announced that a referendum on both same-sex marriage and civil unions was planned. On 12 March, Premier Michael Dunkley announced that the referendum would take place mid-to-late June 2016. The results of the referendum would not be binding and were described by Dunkley as "only a way to get some clarity on the issue". Voters were asked two questions: "Are you in favour of same-sex marriage in Bermuda?" and "Are you in favour of same-sex civil unions in Bermuda?" Opposition Leader Marc Bean added that after the results of the referendum are announced, the government would govern accordingly.

The non-binding referendum on same-sex unions was held in Bermuda on 23 June 2016.Referendum (Same Sex Relationships) Act 2016 Bermuda Laws Online Both proposals were rejected by 60–70% of voters though the referendum was legally invalid, as less than 50% of eligible voters turned out.

Legal proceedings
A November 2015 ruling from the Supreme Court of Bermuda found that the same-sex partners of Bermuda residents should have the same rights to employment and benefits as all other spouses in Bermuda without restrictions from immigration requirements. The government did not indicate that it would appeal the decision; but it asked for implementation of the judgment to be suspended for an evaluation of the full scope of the judgment on such laws affecting "bankruptcy, estates, wills, succession rules, the right to inherit or receive bequests, health insurance legislation, pensions and social insurance". The ruling came into effect on 29 February 2016.

In June 2016, after the referendum, two same-sex couples indicated they would apply for marriage licenses and hope for a court ruling to settle the issue. On 6 July 2016, a male same-sex couple filed notice of their intent to marry with an accompanying letter from their attorney requesting that the banns be posted within two days. The letter went on to state that unless the registrar notified the parties within two days, proceedings would be initiated in the Supreme Court of Bermuda.

On 8 July 2016, the Registrar General's office rejected the application to publish banns for the same-sex couple that had applied for a license earlier in the week, which prompted their attorney to file a writ asking the Supreme Court to determine if the refusal contravened the provisions of the Human Rights Act.

The case was heard by acting Chief Justice Charles-Etta Simmons of the Supreme Court on 1–3 February 2017.

Supreme Court ruling (2017)
Judge Charles-Etta Simmons issued her ruling in favour of same-sex marriage on 5 May 2017. Judge Simmons wrote that "on the facts, the applicants (Winston Godwin and his Canadian fiancé, Greg DeRoche) were discriminated against on the basis of their sexual orientation when the Registrar refused to process their notice of intended marriage.... The applicants are entitled to an Order of Mandamus compelling the Registrar to act in accordance with the requirements of the Marriage Act 1944 and a declaration that same-sex couples are entitled to be married under the Marriage Act 1944."

The Rainbow Alliance issued a statement praising the ruling: "the ruling is a victory for all same-gender loving people in Bermuda [and] ensures that same-gender couples can enjoy the same legal protections as heterosexual spouses do". The group Preserve Marriage criticised the ruling as "an attack on traditional marriage [and] on Christian and other faith-based traditional values".

Judge Simmons' ruling included a draft order giving effect to the judgement, but she heard from counsel on precise terms of the final order before giving it effect. The final order, which included a requirement on the part of the government to pay the petitioners' legal costs, was published on 22 September 2017.

On 9 May 2017, Minister of Home Affairs Patricia Gordon-Pamplin said that the government would not appeal the ruling. The Registrar General posted the first wedding banns for a same-sex couple on 17 May, and the first same-sex marriage ceremony in Bermuda was celebrated on 31 May 2017.

The ruling was welcomed by the operators of several cruise lines with Bermuda-flagged ships on which marriage ceremonies are performed under Bermuda law.

The Preserve Marriage organisation, which intervened in the proceedings, and a separate group opposed to same-sex marriage sought to appeal the decision to the full bench of the Supreme Court, but leave to appeal was not granted.

Domestic Partnership Act 2018

After the July 2017 elections, which resulted in the Progressive Labour Party (PLP) returning a comfortable majority of MPs in the House of Assembly, PLP MP Wayne Furbert stated he would reintroduce a bill banning same-sex marriage to the Parliament in September and that he expected the bill to pass. Furbert stated the bill would need to be passed by only the Senate if it was amended. If it passed in its current form it would not need the approval of the Senate before being sent to the Governor for royal assent. The government stated that if Furbert's private member's bill passed the Parliament, it would draft a bill allowing same-sex couples rights equal to non-married heterosexual couples, akin to civil unions. After Furbert's announcement, several experts doubted the capacity of the bill to avoid Senate scrutiny, particularly if it was amended to make arrangements for existing same-sex marriages.

On 2 November 2017, the newly elected government introduced a bill to replace same-sex marriage with domestic partnerships. Two weeks of public consultation on the bill was held in various locations. The bill was strongly criticised by human rights groups, the Human Rights Commission and the Rainbow Alliance of Bermuda, which called it "an embarrassment" and "disappointing". The law would provide domestic partners with many of the same rights as married couples, particularly in areas such as pensions, inheritance, healthcare, tax, and immigration. The bill was debated in the House of Assembly and passed by a 24–10 vote on 8 December 2017. It then passed the Senate by an 8–3 vote on 13 December 2017. The provision of royal assent, usually a formality, was debated in the British Parliament and the subject of a lengthy review by Her Majesty's Government and the Governor of Bermuda. Foreign Secretary Boris Johnson received calls to withhold his approval of the bill, as territorial governors may refuse to assent certain bills but require the approval of the Foreign and Commonwealth Office to do so. Eventually, on 7 February 2018, the Governor provided assent to the bill, allowing the law to go into effect on a day to be appointed by the Minister of Home Affairs.Domestic Partnership Act 2018 (refer to p. 31 for note on commencement) A number of international politicians and human rights organisations criticised the change and argued that the move would ultimately damage the island's tourist industry. Same-sex marriages performed before the law commenced would remain recognised under the new law.

The Bermudian Tourism Authority expressed fears and concerns that Bermuda would experience an economic fallout if the law went into effect.

Bermuda's repeal of same-sex marriage received significant and considerable international media coverage. The Guardian and The New York Times reported that "Bermuda had become the first country to repeal same-sex marriage". The repeal was met with calls for a boycott. #BoycottBermuda quickly began trending on Twitter and other social media outlets.

In response, LGBT groups proposed challenging the new law in court, as it "removes an established fundamental human right". Lawyer Mark Pettingill, who successfully argued before the Supreme Court in 2017 that same-sex marriage was a human right, said that any further legal action would need to be heard in higher, namely European, courts.

On 28 February 2018, the Minister of Home Affairs, Walter Roban, announced that the Domestic Partnership Act 2018 would take effect on 1 June 2018. Same-sex couples who wished to marry before that date had to apply for a marriage licence by 12 May. The Commencement Notice was issued on 9 April 2018.

Legal challenges
A challenge against the law was filed with the Supreme Court on 16 February 2018. A second lawsuit against the law was announced on 3 April 2018. A hearing was held on 21 and 22 May 2018 before the Chief Justice of the court.

The court ruled on the matter on 6 June 2018, revoking the parts of the law that prevented same-sex couples from marrying and held that "maintaining or restoring a definition of marriage that disadvantaged those who believe in same-sex marriage discriminated against them on the grounds of their creed contrary to section 12 of the Bermuda Constitution". The court agreed to an application by the Attorney-General to stay the ruling by six weeks to allow the government to consider an appeal. On 5 July, the Minister of Home Affairs, Walter Roban, confirmed that an appeal had been filed with the Court of Appeal. The court heard oral arguments on 7, 8 and 9 November 2018. On 23 November, the court upheld the Supreme Court's ruling and refused to stay the decision. On 13 December 2018, Roban announced that the government had applied to the Court of Appeal for permission to appeal the ruling to the Judicial Committee of the Privy Council. On 29 May 2019, Roban said that permission to appeal had been granted. The government filed the notice of appeal on 12 July 2019. The appeal was heard on 3 and 4 February 2021. The Council handed down its decision on 14 March 2022. It held by a four-to-one margin that the Domestic Partnership Act's ban on the recognition of same-sex marriage was not unconstitutional, and reversed the Court of Appeal's ruling. Lord Hodge, Lady Arden, Lord Reed and Dame Victoria Sharp held that there was no provision in Bermuda's Constitution that would "nullify a legislative provision enacted by the Legislature on the ground that it had been enacted for a religious purpose" and that Section 8 of the Constitution imposed no legal obligation on the government to recognise same-sex marriage. Lord Sales dissented and wrote that a gay or lesbian person seeking to marry are "hindered in the exercise of their freedom of conscience, in violation of Section 8(1) of the Constitution". British academic Nicola Barker responded that the supporters of same-sex marriage would stand a good chance of overturning the council's ruling at the European Court of Human Rights, though no such challenge has been formally lodged.

A March 2019 estimate showed that the court cases surrounding same-sex marriage had cost US$120,000-150,000. However, a May 2019 estimate by association OutBermuda suggested that the total cost of the court cases is likely to cost taxpayers as much as US$3 million.

Statistics
Between May 2017 and June 2018, 20 same-sex couples married in Bermuda, of which 14 on the island itself and 6 on board Bermudian-registered ships. By May 2019, there had been two more same-sex marriages since the Court of Appeal's judgment in November 2018.

By May 2019, three couples had entered into domestic partnerships.

2022 legislation
In July 2022, laws were passed within Bermuda to retrospectively backdate same-sex marriage legality formally prior to March 2022.

Public opinion
An opinion poll in July 2010 showed 27% of respondents in favour of same-sex marriage and 51% against.

An October 2015 poll by Global Research commissioned by The Royal Gazette'' found that 48% of Bermudians supported same-sex marriage and that 44% opposed it.

An August 2020 opinion poll conducted by Global Research showed that 53% of Bermudians supported same-sex marriage. Support was higher among 18–34-year-olds at 64%. 95% of respondents felt that the legalisation of same-sex marriage had not negatively affected them, and 75% opposed the government spending more money on the issue in court.

See also
 LGBT rights in Bermuda
 2016 Bermudian same-sex union and marriage referendum
 Domestic Partnership Act 2018
 Recognition of same-sex unions in the British Overseas Territories
 Same-sex marriage in the United Kingdom

References

Bermuda
LGBT rights in Bermuda
Bermuda
2017 in LGBT history
2018 in LGBT history
2022 in LGBT history